Nova República (in English, "New Republic") is a district in the city of Santarém, Pará and is about 5 km to the South from the center. It is part of Grande Área da Nova República (English: Great Area of the New Republic), being the most populous and important.

References

External links
 http://www.chs.ubc.ca/consortia/outputs3/Brazil_Mapping_Report-2007-FINAL.pdf

Populated places in Pará